Firunbaidhoo is one of the uninhabited islands of Shaviyani Atoll.

Resettlement
Inhabited until 2004, residents were resettled in the capital of the atoll, Funadhoo. The population of the island was around 720 in 1999, with 120 homes. However, the government decided to initiate resettlement of the islanders due to several development obstacles.

Uninhabited islands of the Maldives